The A. E. Backus Museum & Gallery is located at 500 North Indian River Drive, Fort Pierce, Florida.  This museum houses artwork by A. E. Backus and other Florida artists. The museum contains the largest collection of paintings by A. E. Backus, a preeminent Florida landscape painter.

The A.E. Backus Museum & Gallery, a 5,000 sq. ft. public visual arts facility, was established in 1960 by A.E. Backus and a group of local art enthusiasts. Open five days a week from October through mid-June (summer hours by appointment) the museum features the Nation's largest display of original paintings by Albert Ernest Backus (American 1906 – 1990). The museum also handles consignment sales of Backus paintings as well as other Treasure Coast artists of merit. Four additional exhibition wings feature changing exhibits of artwork by contemporary artists.

See also
The Highwaymen

Notes

External links

Websites
A. E. Backus Museum & Gallery (official website)

Art museums and galleries in Florida
Backus, A.E.
Fort Pierce, Florida
Museums in St. Lucie County, Florida